The XXXIX Reserve Corps was a corps level command of the German Army in World War I.

Formation 
XXXIX Reserve Corps was formed in December 1914. It was part of the second wave of new Corps formed in the early stages of World War I consisting of XXXVIII - XXXXI Reserve Corps of 75th - 82nd Reserve Divisions (plus 8th Bavarian Reserve Division). It was still in existence at the end of the war.

Structure on formation 
On formation in December 1914, XXXIX Reserve Corps consisted of two divisions. but was weaker than an Active Corps
the divisions were organised as triangular rather than square divisions with three infantry regiments rather than four, but had a brigade of two field artillery regiments
Reserve Infantry Regiments consisted of three battalions but lacked a machine gun company
Reserve Cavalry Detachments were much smaller than the Reserve Cavalry Regiments formed on mobilisation 
Reserve Field Artillery Regiments consisted of two  (1 gun and 1 howitzer) of three batteries each, but each battery had just 4 guns (rather than 6 of the Active and the Reserve Regiments formed on mobilisation)

In summary, XXXIX Reserve Corps mobilised with 18 infantry battalions, 2 cavalry detachments, 24 field artillery batteries (96 guns), 2 cyclist companies and 2 pioneer companies.

Combat chronicle 
In 1915, the German offensive in Courland was intended to be a diversion while the main effort was made further south by the German 11th Army and Austro-Hungarian 4th Army in the Gorlice–Tarnów Offensive.

Armee-Abteilung Lauenstein (Army Detachment Lauenstein) was formed by upgrading XXXIX Reserve Corps of 10th Army on 22 April 1915.  It was named for its commander, Generalleutnant Otto von Lauenstein, who retained simultaneous command of XXXIX Reserve Corps.  It was directly under the command of OB East.

Due to its success, it was continuously reinforced until it was raised to the status of an army as the Army of the Niemen on 26 May 1915.  Generalleutnant von Lauenstein remained as commander of XXXIX Reserve Corps.

Commanders 
XXXIX Reserve Corps had the following commanders during its existence:

Glossary 
Armee-Abteilung or Army Detachment in the sense of "something detached from an Army".  It is not under the command of an Army so is in itself a small Army.
Armee-Gruppe or Army Group in the sense of a group within an Army and under its command, generally formed as a temporary measure for a specific task.
Heeresgruppe or Army Group in the sense of a number of armies under a single commander.

See also 

Armee-Abteilung Lauenstein

References

Bibliography 
 
 
 
 
 

Corps of Germany in World War I
Military units and formations established in 1914
Military units and formations disestablished in 1918